Dziurzynski or Dziurzyński (feminine: Dziurzyńska; plural: Dziurzyńscy) is a Polish surname. Notable people with this surname include:

 David Dziurzynski (born 1989), Canadian ice hockey player
 Zofia Dziurzyńska-Rosińska (1896–1979), Polish painter

Polish-language surnames